Here is a non-exhaustive comparison of speech synthesis programs:

General

Technical voice details

Technical details 

 
Speech synthesizers